The Trojan Brothers is a 1944 comedy novel by the British writer Pamela Hansford Johnson. In 1920s London two music hall performers whose act involves them dressing as the respective ends of a pantomime horse have a falling out when one of them falls for an attractive society lady.

Adaptation
In 1946 it was made into a British film of the same title directed by Maclean Rogers and starring Patricia Burke, David Farrar and Bobby Howes.

References

Bibliography
 David, Dierdre. Pamela Hansford Johnson: A Writing Life.  Oxford University Press, 2017.
 Goble, Alan. The Complete Index to Literary Sources in Film. Walter de Gruyter, 1999.

1944 British novels
Novels set in London
British novels adapted into films
British comedy novels
Novels set in the 1920s
Novels by Pamela Hansford Johnson
Michael Joseph books